The Polk County Courthouse is a historic government building at Church Avenue and DeQueen Streets in Mena, Arkansas, the county seat of Polk County.  The original portion of the building is a two-story light-colored brick structure, with restrained Art Deco styling.  It was designed by Haralson and Mott of Fort Smith, and was built in 1939 with funding from the Public Works Administration.  To the rear of the courthouse is a modern wing, joined by a breezeway.  The original building is little-altered—only its front doors have been replaced with modern glass and aluminum doors.

The building was listed on the National Register of Historic Places in 1992.

See also
National Register of Historic Places listings in Polk County, Arkansas

References

Courthouses on the National Register of Historic Places in Arkansas
Art Deco architecture in Arkansas
Buildings and structures in Polk County, Arkansas
National Register of Historic Places in Polk County, Arkansas